Coltishall railway station serves the village of Coltishall in Norfolk, and is currently operated by the Bure Valley Railway.

Standard gauge operation
The railway line from Wroxham to County School opened in 1880, with a station at Coltishall. This was a branch line, joined at County School to the Great Eastern Railway's service from Dereham to Wells-next-the-Sea. The station was host to a LNER camping coach from 1935 to 1939. Passenger services were ended in 1952 by the Eastern Region of British Railways, and Coltishall station closed. The original station buildings are now privately owned and operated as bed and breakfast accommodation.

Bure Valley Railway

The line from Wroxham to Aylsham was reopened in 1990 as a narrow gauge railway. The station at Coltishall was reopened as part of this development. The station is a request stop, although many trains are obliged to stop here as it is also a passing place on the single-track railway. There are two platforms. The station is located near to the village of Coltishall, although some distance from its main tourist destinations, the former RAF Coltishall airbase, and the staithe.

References

Heritage railway stations in Norfolk
Former Great Eastern Railway stations
Railway stations in Great Britain opened in 1879
Railway stations in Great Britain closed in 1952
Railway stations in Great Britain opened in 1990